Cassida nebulosa is a tortoise beetle, a species of leaf beetle (family Chrysomelidae), belonging to the subfamily Cassidinae.

It feeds on several plants of the family Chenopodiaceae; particularly on beet Beta vulgaris, on Chenopodium album, on C. glaucum and on Atriplex hortensis.

It is widely distributed in most of Europe.

References

External links
Culex.biol.uni.wroc.pl
Fauna Europaea

Forrás: Tolnai Lexikon XIV. kötet 64 oldal. 1929

Cassidinae
Beetles of Europe
Beetles described in 1758
Taxa named by Carl Linnaeus